Murat Ocak (born 1 January 1982, in Bafra) is a former Turkish professional footballer. He has been retired from retired from professional sport as of 2015.

Club career 
Ocak joined Çaykur Rizespor from Trabzonspor in August 2008.  He joined Trabzonspor in July 2006, and went on loan to Ankaragücü and Istanbul Büyükşehir Belediyespor during 2007 and 2008.

International career 
Ocak has made three appearances for the full Turkey national football team, his debut coming in a friendly against Estonia on May 28, 2006.

References

External links 
 
 

1982 births
Living people
Turkish footballers
Turkey international footballers
Trabzonspor footballers
MKE Ankaragücü footballers
İstanbul Başakşehir F.K. players
Çaykur Rizespor footballers
Süper Lig players
Çorumspor footballers
Karşıyaka S.K. footballers
Altay S.K. footballers
Giresunspor footballers
People from Bafra
Association football defenders